Akigawa may refer to:

Agigawa Dam, Japan
Aki River, a river in Japan, in Japanese, the Akigawa
Akigawa Station, train station in Akigawa, Japan
Akigawa, Tokyo, former municipality in Tokyo, Japan
Holiday Rapid Okutama or Holiday Rapid Akigawa, a train service operating in Tokyo, Japan

See also
 Masafumi Akikawa (born 1967), Japanese tenor